Dioxyini is a tribe of cuckoo bees in the family Megachilidae. There are eight genera in Dioxyini, comprising 36 species.

Genera
 Aglaoapis Cameron, 1901
 Allodioxys Popov, 1947
 Dioxys Lepeletier & Serville, 1825
 Ensliniana Alfken, 1938
 Eudioxys Mavromoustakis, 1963
 Metadioxys Popov, 1947
 Paradioxys Mocsáry, 1894
 Prodioxys Friese, 1914

References

External links

Megachilidae
Hymenoptera tribes